ʿAbbās Wasīm Efendi (1689–1760) was an Ottoman astronomer who wrote translations and commentaries used by astronomers and timekeepers of the Ottoman state. His most important work is a Turkish commentary on Ulugh Beg's Zij. He was born in Bursa, Turkey and died in Istanbul.

References

1689 births
1760 deaths
18th-century astronomers
Astronomers from the Ottoman Empire